All God's Children is a 2012 Moldovan drama film directed by Adrian Popovici. The film was selected as the Moldovan entry for the Best Foreign Language Film at the 86th Academy Awards, but was not nominated. It was the first time the country submitted a film in this category.

The film narrates the story of Irina and Peter, a couple who lost their young child in an accident. The couple moves to Moldova and adopts Pavalas, a child that reminds them of their late son. In order to adopt the child, Irina and her friend travel to Italy where they get caught in a network of prostitution and crime that will test her resolve and love for the child.

Cast
 Jhoni Alici as The Bartender  
 Lilia Bejan as The Maid  
 Ion Beregoi as Gicu  
 Vas Blackwood as Mark  
 Emergian Cazac as Pavalas  
 Anatol Durbală as Feghea  
 Arcel Ioseliani as Soldier #1  
 Michael Ironside as Peter  
 Alexei Machevnin as Soldier #2  
 Rodica Oanta as Tatiana  
 Leo Rudenco as Moustache Man  
 Paolo Seganti as Bruno  
 Mihaela Strambeanu as School Director  
 Ina Surdu as Irina  
 Alina Turcanu as Alina

See also
 List of submissions to the 86th Academy Awards for Best Foreign Language Film
 List of Moldovan submissions for the Academy Award for Best Foreign Language Film

References

External links
 

2012 films
2012 drama films
2010s Italian-language films
Moldovan drama films
2010s Romanian-language films
2012 multilingual films